Adelpha mesentina, the mesentina sister, is a species of butterfly of the family Nymphalidae. It is found in the eastern Andes from Venezuela to Bolivia and also on the Guiana Shield and throughout the central and western Amazon basin.

The wingspan is about 54 mm.

References

Adelpha
Nymphalidae of South America
Butterflies described in 1777
Taxa named by Pieter Cramer